George Souza Jr. (born 19 August 1942) is a Hong Kong former international lawn and indoor bowler.

Bowls career
Born in 1942 in Shanghai he first represented Hong Kong in the singles at the 1978 Commonwealth Games. He won a gold medal in the fours at the 1980 World Outdoor Bowls Championship in Melbourne.

Souza won four medals at the Asia Pacific Bowls Championships including two gold medals in the 1985 triples at Tweed Heads, New South Wales and the 1991 triples at Kowloon.

In 1984, he won the Hong Kong International Bowls Classic singles title, in addition to winning three pairs titles in 1983, 1984 and 1994.

Personal life
Souza is the son of George Souza Sr.

References

1942 births
Living people
Bowls players at the 1978 Commonwealth Games
Bowls World Champions
Hong Kong male bowls players